Cheatham may refer to:

 Cheatham County, Tennessee, a county located in the U.S. state of Tennessee
 Cheatham Middle School, a middle school in the Clarksville Independent School District, Texas, United States
 Cheatham (surname)

See also
 Cheetham (disambiguation)